Patrick is a 2018 British family comedy film directed by Mandie Fletcher, who co-wrote the film with Vanessa Davies and Paul de Vos, and distributed by Buena Vista International.

Plot

The film is about a young woman named Sarah, whose life changes when her grandmother bequeaths her prized possession, a spoilt Pug named Patrick.

Sarah recently moved into a new apartment with a no-pet policy and just got employed teaching year 11 English.

She struggles to deal with both Patrick and discipline in her school. After a few incidents with Patrick, she finally connects with the students and really starts to connect with Patrick.

Patrick helps her to meet two potential love interests, one is a narcissistic vet and the other is a student’s father, Ben.

She loses Patrick, but then finds him waiting for her at the end of a 5 km charity run (where she raised £1,000 for a mobility scooter).

In the closing scenes, Sarah and Ben sail a boat down a river with Ben’s daughter on deck.

Cast
 Beattie Edmondson as Sarah Francis
 Emily Atack as Becky
 Ed Skrein as the Vet
 Tom Bennett as Ben
 Adrian Scarborough as Mr. Peters
 Jennifer Saunders as Maureen
 Bernard Cribbins as Albert 
 Peter Davison as Alan
 Cherie Lunghi as Rosemary
 Meera Syal as Head Teacher Phillips
 Roy Hudd as Eric the Caretaker
 Gemma Jones as Celia
 Olivia Buckland as Vet's Receptionist

Release
The film was originally scheduled for an 24 August 2018 release, but in November 2017 the film was pushed forward to 29 June 2018 in place of the initial UK release of Ant-Man and the Wasp, which was pushed back to 3 August 2018 to avoid competition with the 2018 FIFA World Cup. The film opened at #8 in the UK, moving up to #7 the following week.

In other countries, the film was released by various other distributors later in 2018. It received a limited release in the United States in February 2019 by Screen Media Films, grossing $6,290.

Home media
The movie was released on DVD in the UK on 3 November 2018 by Walt Disney Studios Home Entertainment under the Buena Vista Home Entertainment label.

Reception

Critical response
On Rotten Tomatoes, the film has an approval rating of  based on  reviews. The site's critical consensus reads, "Its pugnacious protagonist is certainly adorable, but the thoroughly formulaic Patrick will only give paws to the most pup-obsessed film fans." On Metacritic the film has a score of 28% based on reviews from 9 critics, indicating "generally unfavorable reviews".

References

External links
 

2018 films
2018 comedy films
Films about dogs
Films about educators
British comedy films
Buena Vista International films
Films directed by Mandie Fletcher
Films about pets
2010s English-language films
2010s British films